Kevin Brian Henry de Klerk  (born 6 June 1950 in Johannesburg, South Africa) is a former South African rugby union player.

Playing career

Youth and Provincial career
De Klerk started his rugby career with Transvaal when he was picked to represent the Transvaal schools team at the annual Craven Week tournament in 1968. De Klerk was again selected for the Schools team in 1969. His playing career with Transvaal continued after school, when he was selected for the under-20 age group team. De Klerk made his provincial first team debut for Transvaal in 1971.

International career
De Klerk made his test debut for the Springboks on 8 June 1974 at Newlands in Cape Town against the touring British Lions team, captained by Willie John McBride. De Klerk played in the second test in the series against the British Lions, but was dropped for the third test and replaced by Moaner van Heerden. In subsequent years it was often a choice between de Klerk and Van Heerden for the number 4 lock position in the Springbok team.

Following the 1974 test series against the British Lions, de Klerk also represent the Springboks against the, 1975 French touring team, the 1976 All Blacks, the 1980  South American Jaguars  and British Lions, and the 1981 Irish touring team. De Klerk’s last test match was against Ireland on his 31st birthday, 6 June 1981 at Kings Park Stadium, Durban. De Klerk played 13 test matches for the Springboks.

Test history

Accolades
De Klerk was named one of the five SA Rugby players of the Year for 1972. The four other players named, were two members of the 1972 England team that toured South Africa, namely Sam Doble and John Pullin, as well as the South African flanker Jan Ellis and future Springbok Carel Fourie.

Rugby administration
Since his playing days and from 2000, De Klerk has served in various executive capacities with the Golden Lions Rugby Union, the Lions Rugby Company (Pty) Ltd. and Ellis Park Stadium (Pty) Ltd. He was elected president of the Golden Lions Rugby Union in July 2009 and held this position until his retirement in August 2018.

See also
List of South Africa national rugby union players – Springbok no. 464

References

1950 births
Living people
South African rugby union players
South Africa international rugby union players
Golden Lions players
Rugby union locks
Rugby union players from Johannesburg